CKFT-FM is a Canadian radio station broadcasting at 107.9 FM in Fort Saskatchewan, Alberta with an adult contemporary format branded as Mix 107. The station is owned by Golden West Broadcasting. the station received approval by the CRTC on January 10, 2012. and began broadcasting on November 27 of that year.

Testing of the signal began on October 23, 2012, to check the strength of its signal and test out potential interference with emergency frequencies. As CKFT is just 25 kilometres from Edmonton, Andrew Nakonechny, program director of CKFT, promised CKFT would "be all about Fort Saskatchewan."

On November 27, 2012, CKFT announced the name of the station to be Mix 107.9, and officially launched at 10 a.m. MST.

References

External links
Mix 107.9

Kft
Kft
Kft
Radio stations established in 2012
2012 establishments in Alberta